Gregorio Ynciong Zara (8 March 1902 – 15 October 1978) was a Filipino engineer, physicist, a National Scientist, and inventor. He was known as the father of videoconferencing for having invented the first two-way videophone. He was also one of the country's pioneer aeronautical engineer having invented an airplane engine that ran on plain alcohol as fuel. Among his other notable inventions include a solar-powered water heater,, the discovery of the physical law of electrical kinetic resistance called the Zara effect,, and a propeller-cutting machine, among others.

Education 
A native of Lipa, Batangas, Zara finished primary schooling at Lipa Elementary School, where he graduated as valedictorian in 1918. In 1922, he again graduated valedictorian in Batangas High School, an accolade which warranted him a grant to study abroad. With full support from his parents he then enrolled at the University of the Philippines in Manila.

Zara then enrolled at the Massachusetts Institute of Technology (MIT) in the United States, and graduated with a degree of BS in Mechanical Engineering in 1926. After that he obtained a Master of Science in Engineering (Aeronautical Engineering) at the University of Michigan in 1927, where he graduated as summa cum laude. In 1930, Zara then sailed to France to take up advanced studies in physics at the Sorbonne University, in Paris, France. He graduated summa cum laude with a degree of Doctor of Science in Physics, with "Tres Honorable," the highest honor conferred to graduate students.

Career 
Upon his return to the Philippines, Zara was appointed technical assistant on aviation matters in the office of the Secretary of Department of Public Works and Communications (DPWC). Subsequently, he became chief of the aeronautical division of the DPWC. In 1936, he was assistant director and chief aeronautical engineer in the Bureau of Aeronautics of the Department of National Defense. For 21 years, he was director of aeronautical board, a position he held and confirmed by the Congress of the Philippines up to 1952. Considered expert in the field, he was chosen to be the technical editor of Aviation Monthly and at various times, he worked as vice chairman and acting chairman of the National Science Development Board, where a number of science projects were impetus.

While busy in government positions, Zara also was an educator. He was an instructor of aeronautics at the Valeriano Aviation School, at the American Far Eastern School of Aviation (1933) and at the Far Eastern University (1937–41). At FEATI University, he was professor of aeronautics (1946), then head of the Aeronautical Engineering Department (1962) and later dean of Engineering and Technology and director of research. He was elected executive vice-president of the university from 1946 to 1962 and acting president in 1956.

He retired from government service in 1946 and joined the Far Eastern Air Transport Incorporated (FEATI) and eventually became a member of its board of trustees. He was also a member of the board of directors of the National Shipyards and Steel Corporation and of the Civil Aeronautics Board.

On October 15, 1978, at the age of 76, Zara died of heart failure. He was survived by his wife, the former Miss Philippines and Queen of the 1933 Philippine Carnival, Engracia Laconico, and four children: Antonio, Pacita, Josefina, and Lourdes. The Philippine government accorded him a state funeral at the Libingan ng mga Bayani.

Awards and Recognitions
During his lifetime he received several awards, which include the following:

In 1978 he was conferred the Order of National Scientist by President Ferdinand Marcos.

References 

20th-century Filipino engineers
National Scientists of the Philippines
1902 births
1978 deaths
University of Michigan College of Engineering alumni
Filipino physicists
Filipino inventors
University of the Philippines Manila alumni
MIT School of Engineering alumni
University of Paris alumni
People from Lipa, Batangas
Burials at the Libingan ng mga Bayani
20th-century inventors